Saskatoon Churchill-Wildwood is a provincial electoral district for the Legislative Assembly of Saskatchewan, Canada. It was first contested in the 2016 election.

The district was created out of parts of Saskatoon Greystone, Saskatoon Eastview and Saskatoon Nutana.

Members of the Legislative Assembly

Election results

References

Saskatchewan provincial electoral districts
Politics of Saskatoon